Cocobeach Airport  was an airstrip formerly serving Cocobeach, in Estuaire Province, Gabon.

See also

 List of airports in Gabon
 Transport in Gabon

References

External links
HERE/Nokia - Cocobeach
Cocobeach Airport
OurAirports - Cocobeach

Defunct airports
Airports in Gabon